Stowe is a census-designated place (CDP) in West Pottsgrove Township, Montgomery County, Pennsylvania, United States. The population was 3,695 at the 2010 census. It uses the Pottstown ZIP code of 19464.

Geography
Stowe is located at  (40.251695, -75.681230).

It occupies the space between Pottstown on the east and Berks County on the west, while the Schuylkill River forms its natural southern boundary. Stowe has the Pottstown Expressway (U.S. Route 422) and High Street as its east-to-west thoroughfares. Grosstown Road is the main north-to-south route and interchanges with 422 at its southern terminus.

Stowe's hardiness zone is 7a and the climate is borderline Cfa/Dfa (humid subtropical/hot summer humid continental.) It is served by the Pottstown post office and telephone exchange.

Demographics

As of the 2010 census, the CDP was 83.3% Non-Hispanic White, 9.7% Black or African American, 0.3% Native American and Alaskan Native, 0.6% Asian, 0.9% were Some Other Race, and 3.1% were two or more races. 3.3% of the population were of Hispanic or Latino ancestry.

At the 2000 census there were 3,585 people, 1,433 households, and 951 families living in the CDP. The population density was 2,456.6 people per square mile (948.1/km2). There were 1,507 housing units at an average density of 1,032.7/sq mi (398.5/km2).  The racial makeup of the CDP was 89.26% White, 7.22% African American, 0.17% Native American, 0.89% Asian, 0.03% Pacific Islander, 0.73% from other races, and 1.70% from two or more races. Hispanic or Latino of any race were 2.12%.

There were 1,433 households, 29.6% had children under the age of 18 living with them, 51.9% were married couples living together, 10.8% had a female householder with no husband present, and 33.6% were non-families. 27.3% of households were made up of individuals, and 9.7% were one person aged 65 or older. The average household size was 2.50 and the average family size was 3.08.

The age distribution was 24.6% under the age of 18, 7.7% from 18 to 24, 31.6% from 25 to 44, 22.3% from 45 to 64, and 13.7% 65 or older. The median age was 37 years. For every 100 females, there were 92.8 males. For every 100 females age 18 and over, there were 91.2 males.

The median household income was $42,434 and the median family income  was $50,605. Males had a median income of $32,264 versus $29,318 for females. The per capita income for the CDP was $18,515. About 6.1% of families and 7.9% of the population were below the poverty line, including 9.6% of those under age 18 and 6.5% of those age 65 or over.

References

External links

Census-designated places in Montgomery County, Pennsylvania
Populated places on the Schuylkill River